This is a list of wars involving the Republic of Honduras.

List

References

 
Honduras
Honduras-related lists